Cheikh M'Baye (born 14 July 1995) is a Senegalese footballer who plays as a central defender.

Career

Club career
M'Baye was born in Saint-Louis, Senegal and played for five years at the Diambars-academy. In the summer of 2014 he went on trials in France with Lille and Marseille before signing with FC Girondins de Bordeaux in August 2014 after being discovered by Patrick Battiston. In October 2014, he made his debut for Bordeaux B and went on to make 7 appearances for the club.

In May 2015 it was reported that M'Baye would be joining Auxerre but the move never materialized. On 28 January 2016 it was reported that M'Baye would be joining New York Red Bulls during their pre-season training.
After his trial with the first team, M'Baye signed with New York Red Bulls II of the United Soccer League on 8 April 2016. On 17 April M'Baye made his debut for the club as a second half substitute in a scoreless draw against the Rochester Rhinos.

International career

Cheikh M'Baye has represented Senegal at the U20 level.

References

External links
 
 foot-national.com profile 
 girondins.com profile

1995 births
Living people
Senegalese footballers
FC Girondins de Bordeaux players
New York Red Bulls II players
USL Championship players
Association football defenders
Sportspeople from Saint-Louis, Senegal